Rock Hill may refer to:
 Rock Hill, Georgia, an unincorporated community
 Rock Hill, Indiana, an unincorporated community
 Rock Hill, Louisiana, an unincorporated community
 Rock Hill, Missouri, small city in Missouri
 Rock Hill, New York, hamlet in New York
 Rock Hill (Herkimer County, New York), an elevation in Herkimer County, New York
 Rock Hill, South Carolina, fifth-largest city in South Carolina
 The Aaron Copland House, a National Historic Landmark in Cortlandt Manor, New York, also known as Rock Hill

See also
 Rockhill (disambiguation)
 Rocky Hill (disambiguation)
 Rocky Gap, Virginia
 Rockville (disambiguation)